Stephen Grant Serpell (born 4 February 1944) was a British member of several bands during the 1960s and 1970s, including Affinity and Sailor.

Career
While studying for a degree in Chemistry from the University of Sussex, Serpell founded The Jazz Quartet, and he played with the University of Sussex Jazz Trio (known as The U.S. Jazz Trio).

After graduating, Serpell joined a band called Ice, and then Affinity, before joining Sailor, the band that has provided him with the most fame.

In 1983, during Sailor's quieter times, Serpell became a chemistry teacher, first at Altwood Church of England School and then at Waingels Copse Comprehensive School (now Waingels College), where he became head of the department. While at Waingels College he taught Irwin Sparkes of The Hoosiers and, after hearing a demo from Sparkes and Alan Sharland, encouraged them to experience life a little more to help provide inspiration for their songs.

Serpell enjoyed a revival of Sailor's success, which started in the early 1990s. Until retiring in 2011, he toured the UK and Europe with the band.

Personal life
Grant married Michelle Kingsland in 1966 and a year later they had their first child, Edmund Charles, followed two years later by their second child, Charlotte Anna.

Discography
According to AllMusic, Serpell contributed to the following albums:

Affinity
 Affinity (1970)

Sailor

 Sailor (1974)
 Trouble (1975)
 The Third Step (1976)
 Checkpoint (1977)
 Greatest Hits Vol.1 (1978)
 Hideaway (1978)
 Girls,Girls,Girls - The Very Best Of (1990)
 Sailor (1991)
 Street Lamp (1992)
 Hits And Highlights (1994)
 Greatest Hits - Best of the Best -2xCD- (1995)
 Greatest Hits - Best of the Best (1995)
 Legacy: Greatest and Latest (1996) – compilation album
 The Very Best of Sailor (1997) – new studio versions of back-catalogue songs
 Live In Berlin (1998)
 Girls Girls Girls (1999)
 Girls Girls Girls - The Very Best of (2001)
 Greatest and Latest (2001)
 Live in Berlin (2002) – re-released as A Glass of Champagne (2003)
 Sailor (2002)
 Girls Girls Girls - The Very Best of (2003)
 A Glass of Champagne (2003)
 Live Piracy Copy - DVD - (2003)
 Live In Concert - DVD - (2004)
 Down By The Docks (2005)
 Greatest Hits - Live (2005)
 Sailor Live (2005)
 Sailor Live - One Drink Too Many - double album - (2005)
 Sailor: Buried Treasure - double album - (2006)
 A Glass of Champagne - Live (2006)
 Buried Treasure - The Sailor Anthology (2007)

References

External links
 

1944 births
Living people
People from Maidenhead
British male singers
British pop singers
British rock drummers
British male drummers
Alumni of the University of Sussex
Affinity (band) members